The Rafah Border Crossing or Rafah Crossing Point is the sole crossing point between Egypt and the Gaza Strip. It is located on the Gaza–Egypt border, which was recognized by the 1979 Egypt–Israel peace treaty. The original crossing point was named Rafah land port. Only passage of persons is allowed to take place through the Rafah Border Crossing. As per the Israeli-led blockade of the Gaza Strip, the entrance of any goods into Gaza must go through Israel, usually through the Israeli-controlled Kerem Shalom border crossing.

The gates

The Rafah Land Port became the primary border crossing between Egypt and Gaza, managed by the Israel Airports Authority until Israel had dismantled its settlements in Gaza on 11 September 2005 as part of a disengagement plan. It subsequently became the task of the European Union Border Assistance Mission Rafah (EUBAM) to monitor the crossing. The Rafah land port, known as the "Salah al Din Gate" is located at the original Rafah crossing on the Salah al-Din Road, the main highway of Gaza from Erez to Rafah. Rafah land port was bombed by Israel in October 2009 allegedly to destroy tunnels.

A new "Rafah Crossing Point", also named in Arabic "Al Awda" (The Return), was built south of Rafah.

History

By the Ottoman–British agreement of 1 October 1906, a boundary between Ottoman ruled Palestine and British ruled Egypt, from Taba to Rafah was agreed upon. From 1948, Gaza was occupied by Egypt. Consequently, a Gaza–Egypt border no longer existed. In the 1967 Six-Day War, Israel conquered the Sinai Peninsula and the Gaza Strip from Egypt.

In 1979, Israel and Egypt signed a peace treaty that returned the Sinai, which borders the Gaza Strip, to Egyptian control. As part of that treaty, a 100-meter-wide strip of land known as the Philadelphi Route was established as a buffer zone between Gaza and Egypt. In the Peace Treaty, the re-created Gaza–Egypt border was drawn across the city of Rafah. When Israel withdrew from the Sinai in 1982, Rafah was divided into an Egyptian and a Palestinian part, splitting up families, separated by barbed-wire barriers.

Israeli disengagement

On 16 February 2005, the Israeli parliament approved the Israeli disengagement from Gaza. Israel withdrew from Gaza in September 2005. Control of the Gaza–Egypt border was on the Egyptian side handed over to Egypt. The Fatah-dominated Palestinian National Authority had been given control on the Gazan side of the Border Crossing.

On 7 September 2005, Israel withdrew from Gaza and closed the Rafah crossing. The Philadelphi Accord between Israel and Egypt, based on the principles of the 1979 peace treaty, turned over border control to Egypt, while the supply of arms to the Palestinian Authority was subject to Israeli consent. The agreement specified that 750 Egyptian border guards would be deployed along the length of the border, and both Egypt and Israel pledged to work together to stem terrorism, arms smuggling, and other illegal cross-border activities.

Agreement on Movement and Access
Under the Agreed Principles for Rafah Crossing, part of the Agreement on Movement and Access (AMA) of 15 November 2005, EUBAM was responsible for monitoring the Border Crossing. The agreement ensured Israel authority to dispute entrance by any person.

The Agreed Principles for Rafah stipulate that "Rafah will also be used for export of goods to Egypt". A confidential PLO document reveals that in fact Egypt under President Mubarak did not allow exports. The Palestinians agreed that all imports of goods are diverted to the Kerem Shalom border crossing, because Israel threatened to exclude Gaza from the customs union out of concern about the implementation of the Paris Protocol. On the other hand, the Palestinians agreed because they wanted to limit Israeli interference at Rafah and maximize their sovereignty. Diversion via Kerem was meant as a temporary measure but in fact, imports through Rafah were never realized, forcing the Palestinians to develop a smuggling tunnels economy. Israel had consistently tried to turn the Kerem Shalom border crossing (which borders Egypt) into a commercial crossing between Gaza and Israel, or as an alternative passenger crossing to Rafah. The Palestinians were concerned that Israel would take control over the Gaza-Egypt border or even replace Rafah and objected.

On 26 November 2005, the crossing was opened for the first time under the European Union's supervision, while the Israeli army kept a video watch from a nearby base and retained control over the movement of all goods and trade in and out of Gaza.

Statistics 

After the Israeli disengagement in 2005, the monthly average number of entries and exits through Rafah Crossing reached about 40,000. After the capture of Israeli soldier Gilad Shalit in June 2006, the crossing was closed 76% of the time and after Hamas' takeover of the Gaza Strip it was closed permanently except for infrequent limited openings by Egypt.

From June 2010 to January 2011, the monthly average number of exits and entries through Rafah reached 19,000. After May 2011, when Egypt's President Hosni Mubarak was replaced with Mohamed Morsi, the number grew to 40,000 per month. When Morsi was deposed by the army in July 2013, the Crossing was again almost completely shut down.

In August 2014, for the first time since the start of the Gaza blockade in 2007 Egypt allowed the United Nations World Food Programme (WFP) to bring food through the Rafah crossing. It provided food to feed around 150,000 people for 5 days. In 2014, an average of 8,119 exits and entries of people were recorded at the crossing monthly. In September 2015, it was circa 3,300, while the Gaza population numbered 1.8 million people. Between 24 October 2014 and September 2015, the crossing had been opened for only 34 days.

Closures of the border

2005 to 2007
From November 2005 to July 2007, the Rafah Crossing was jointly controlled by Egypt and the Palestinian Authority, with the European Union monitoring Palestinian compliance on the Gaza side. The Crossing operated daily until June 2006. Israel issued security warnings, thus preventing European monitors from travelling to the terminal. The Hamas-led PA Government threatened on 23 June to terminate the Rafah border-crossing agreement if the border would not be reopened. On 25 June 2006, terrorists attacked the Kerem Shalom Crossing Point and captured the Israeli soldier Gilad Shalit. The Crossing was infrequently reopened after this attack.

On 12 February 2007, PLO Negotiatior Saeb Erekat complained in a letter to the Israeli Government and the Head of the EU Mission about Israel, closing the Rafah Crossing Point (RCP) on most days by indirect measures, such as "preventing access by the EU BAM to the RCP through Kerem Shalom". A 2007 Palestinian background paper mentions the EU concern over crises, "most often caused by the continual Israeli closure of the Crossing". On 7 May 2007, the issue of the Israeli closure of Rafah and Kerem as well was raised at a Coordination and Evaluation meeting. The movement of ambulances via Rafah was prohibited. The EU BAM proposed the use of "shuttle" ambulances at the Crossing, requiring two additional transfers of the patients between the ambulances.

In June 2007, the Rafah Crossing was closed by the Egyptian authorities after Hamas' takeover of the Gaza Strip. Due to the lack of security the EU monitors pulled out of the region, and Egypt agreed with Israel to shut down the Rafah Crossing. The Fatah-led Palestinian Authority in the West Bank has declared that the Rafah Crossing should remain closed until the control by the Presidential Guard is restored.

2007 to 2010

On 22 January 2008, after Israel imposed a total closure on all crossings to the Gaza Strip, a group of Hamas demonstrators attempted to force open the door of the Rafah Crossing. They were beaten back by Egyptian police and gunfire erupted. That same night, Hamas demolished a 200-metre length of the metal border wall with explosives. After the resulting Breach of the Gaza-Egypt border, many thousands of Palestinians, with estimates ranging from 200,000 to 700,000, crossed into Egypt to buy goods. Palestinians were seen purchasing food, fuel, cigarettes, shoes, furniture, car parts, and generators. On 3 February 2008, the border was closed again by Egypt, except for travelers returning home.

On 27 June 2009, Hamas Prime Minister Ismail Haneya proposed a joint  Palestinian, Egyptian and European mechanism to keep the Rafah border crossing working permanently. He said: "We welcome the presence of European inspectors, the Egyptians and the Palestinian presidential guards in addition to the presence of the (Hamas) government in Gaza".

According to a 2009 report of Gisha, Israel continued to exercise control over the border through its control of the Palestinian population registry, which determines who is allowed to go through Rafah Crossing. It also had the power to  use its right to veto the passage of foreigners, even when belonging to the list of  categories of foreigners allowed to cross, and to decide to close the crossing indefinitely. 

Gisha has blamed Israel for keeping the Rafah Crossing closed through indirect means and Egypt for submitting to Israeli pressure and not cooperate with the Hamas government.  Hamas, however was blamed for not allowing the Presidential Guard to apply the AMA agreement. The Palestinian Authority  was blamed for its refusal to compromise with Hamas over control of Rafah Crossing. The EU monitoring force was criticized for its submission to Israel's demands for closing the border, without calling for re-opening. The US was criticized for allowing human rights violations caused by the closure and avoiding pressure on Egypt.

2011 to 2013
The Egyptian government under former President Mubarak had opposed the Hamas administration in Gaza and helped Israel to enforce the blockade. Due to the 2011 Egyptian revolution, Mubarak was forced to step down in February 2011. On 27 April, Fatah and Hamas reached an agreement in Cairo, mediated by Egypt and on 29 April, Egypt announced that the border crossing would be opened on a permanent basis. Mahmoud Abbas and Khaled Meshal signed the Cairo agreement on 4 May 2011 and on 28 May, the crossing was re-opened. Most travel restrictions were dropped, though men between the ages of 18 to 40 entering Egypt must apply for visas and others need travel permits. Soon after the revolution, Egypt's foreign minister, Nabil el-Araby, opened discussions with Hamas aimed at easing the travel restrictions and improving relations between the two. Even though passenger restrictions were loosened, the shipment into Gaza of goods remains blocked. In the first five hours after the opening, 340 people crossed into Egypt. Under the Mubarak regime, Egypt vehemently opposed using Hamas guards at Rafah and demanded that the crossing point remain closed until Palestinian Authority personnel were deployed, but now, the crossing would be operated and guarded by Hamas policemen.

In mid-June 2011 the crossing was closed for several days and after that only a few hundred were allowed to cross each day compared with 'thousands' who applied to cross each day. Egypt reportedly agreed to allow a minimum of 500 people to cross each day.

In July 2013, in the aftermath of the overthrow of Mohamed Morsi, the border crossing was closed for several days by the Egyptian Army. It was later reopened for four hours each day. After widespread unrest in Egypt and the bloody crackdown on loyalists of ousted President Morsi on 14 August, the border crossing was closed 'indefinitely'. Afterwards, it has been opened for a few days every few months.

2013 to 2020
After the 2014 Israel–Gaza conflict, Egypt declared that it was prepared to train forces from the Presidential Guard to man the Rafah Crossing and deploy along the border. Once the forces were ready, Egypt would then open the crossing to full capacity. Egypt mediated a permanent truce between Israel and Hamas, and Foreign Minister Sameh Shoukri said that Egypt hoped that this would lead to the creation of a Palestinian state within the 1967 borders. Palestinian factions in Gaza, including Hamas, publicly declared their acceptance of the return of the Presidential Guard and the EU border mission.

On 22 January 2015, Egypt closed the border crossing. In March, it declared that it would only open the border crossing if the Palestinian side is staffed by Palestinian Authority employees under the full authority of the Presidential Guard and no Hamas personnel are present. Islamic Jihad suggested to Egyptian intelligence that PA and Hamas would open the Rafah Crossing under the supervision and in the presence of the PA and the Presidential Guard. Egyptian intelligence and Hamas appeared to agree, but the PA did not respond. Hamas accused Fatah and the PA that they “want to exclude it from political and field landscape by their insisting on the PA monopoly in controlling the crossings and borders”. Hamas had agreed to let the Presidential Guards to take charge, as part of a comprehensive plan to merge employees from West Bank and Gaza Strip. Some Hamas followers voiced annoyance about the PIJ initiative, bypassing Hamas, while Egypt did not regard it a terrorist organization unlike Hamas.

However, Egypt still has occasionally allowed supplies to cross into Gaza via the Rafah Crossing, such as diesel fuel for Gaza's power plant in 2017 and gas in 2018.

In May 2018, Egyptian authorities opened the crossing, permitting a couple hundred Gazans per day to cross into Egypt. As of July 2019, tens of thousands have reportedly done so, departing to destinations in the Arab world or Turkey, and some seeking refuge in Europe (particularly Belgium and Norway).

In March 2020, Palestinian authorities closed the crossing to limit the spread of the virus that causes COVID-19 to the Gaza Strip.

In early November 2020, Egyptian authorities closed the crossing to vehicles and commodities after monitoring violations by Hamas.

2021 to present
In February 2021, Egypt opened the crossing "indefinitely" for the first time in years in what was described as an effort to encourage negotiations between Palestinian factions meeting at the time in Cairo. The crossing was kept open during and after the 11-day Israel-Hamas conflict in May, delivering aid and construction materials. Egypt closed the crossing on 23 August following an escalation of cross-border incidents between Israel and Hamas.

See also 
Philadelphi Route
Gaza–Israel barrier

References

External links 
Movement of people via Rafah Crossing. Statistics from Gisha
Gaza tourism companies call on Sisi to open Rafah crossing. MEMO, 29 February 2016

Egypt–Gaza Strip border crossings